Laring is one of the traditional ethnic Moro weapons of Southern Philippines. It has a lightweight design for slashing and thrusting. It has a two pronged tip like a blade catcher that looks like a snake's tongue. The blade guard has a small round steel for firmer hold and mobility. The handle end has a unique hooked hilt grip design that serves as a counter weight for better handling and balance and to prevent the sword from slippage when pulling out when stuck in a target.

The open type scabbard is made of kalantas wood, a type of Philippine mahogany which allows for quick drawing. The length is about 24-28 inches.

References

Filipino swords